Tolga Doğantez (born 22 February 1975) is a Turkish football coach and former player.

Doğantez played three times for Turkey national football team and twice for Turkey B national football team. At club level, he played for Turgutluspor, Adıyamanspor, Gençlerbirliği, Beşiktaş, İstanbulspor, Ankaraspor, Samsunspor, Sivasspor, Çaykur Rizespor and Karşıyaka S.K.

Honours
Gençlerbirliği
 Turkish Cup: 2001

Beşiktaş
 Süper Lig: 2002–03

References

1975 births
Living people
Association football central defenders
Turkish footballers
Turkey international footballers
Turkey B international footballers
Turgutluspor footballers
Bornovaspor footballers
Göztepe S.K. footballers
Adıyamanspor footballers
Gençlerbirliği S.K. footballers
Beşiktaş J.K. footballers
İstanbulspor footballers
MKE Ankaragücü footballers
Ankaraspor footballers
Diyarbakırspor footballers
Samsunspor footballers
Sivasspor footballers
Çaykur Rizespor footballers
Manisaspor footballers
Boluspor footballers
Karşıyaka S.K. footballers
Turkish sportspeople in doping cases